Elections were held in Dufferin County, Ontario on October 27, 2014 in conjunction with municipal elections across the province.

Dufferin County Council
Dufferin County Council has 14 members, two from each constituent municipality except for East Garafraxa and East Luther Grand Valley which elect just one member.

Amaranth

East Garafraxa

Grand Valley

Melancthon

Mono

Mulmur

Orangeville

Shelburne

References
 

Dufferin
Dufferin County